Minna  Stern (20 March 1894 – 25 May 1982), known professionally as Hermine Sterler, was a German-American actress whose career spanned both the silent and the talkie film eras on two continents.

Career 
Sterler, who appeared in several Hollywood films, was once affiliated with the Burgtheater in Vienna.

She debuted in 1918 at the Residenztheater Hannover and later performed in Berlin, where she appeared at the Kleinen Theater ("Little Theater"). She played a saloon lady and, from 1921, often appeared in German silent film. She flourished as a character actor in roles of young wives and mothers. In 1930, she appeared as Tsarina Alexandra Feodorovna in Rasputin, Demon with Women.

In 1933, a German government decree was enacted by Joseph Goebbels under the auspices of a newly created agency called Die Reichskulturkammer. The decree stipulated that Jewish actors were, among other things, prohibited from performing on German stage.  

Sterler, who was a Jew, relocated to Vienna in 1933, where she continued to work in theater and cinema. The Anschluss of Austria ended her artistic career there.  Sterler next moved to London.  In 1938, she immigrated to the United States from Zurich under her birth name Minna Stern. Film director Wilhelm Dieterle gave Sterler her first role in American cinema.

During World War II and after, Sterler played mostly small roles in Hollywood productions portraying German or other European women. In the 1944 anti-Nazi film The Hitler Gang, she played the wife of Ernst Hanfstaengl.

On November 10, 1944, Sterler became a United States naturalized citizen in the U.S. District Court for the Central District of California at Los Angeles.

She gave actress Piper Laurie private acting lessons when Laurie was a child.

Death
Hermine Sterler died on 25 May 1982, aged 88, in her native Stuttgart.

Selected filmography 
Silent film

 Die Hexe (1921)
 Hannele's Journey to Heaven (1922) - Frau Berger
 Lumpaci the Vagabond (1922)
 The Five Frankfurters (1922) - Gräfin Stadion
 The Love Nest (1922)
 Der Mann mit der eisernen Maske (1923)
 Paganini (1923) - The Duchess
 People in Need (1925) - Elisabeth Ditten, Gutsbesitzerin
 The Hanseatics (1925)
 People to Each Other (1926) - Oberin des Gefängnisses
 Children of No Importance (1926) - Frau Berndt
 Orphan of Lowood (1926) - Lehrerin
 Wie bleibe ich jung und schön - Ehegeheimnisse (1926)
 German Women - German Faithfulness (1927) - Regine Vollrath
 Prinz Louis Ferdinand (1927) - Rahel Lewis
 Potsdam (1927)
 Regine (1927) - Die Hausdame
 Das Schicksal einer Nacht (1927)
 Dame Care (1928) - Seine Frau
 Endangered Girls (1928)
 The Lady from Argentina (1928)
 The Sinner (1928) - Odettes Mutter
 Mädchenschicksale (1928) - Irinas Mutter
 Der Ladenprinz (1928) - Rosanna
 Strauss Is Playing Today (1928) - Anna, seine Frau
 The Republic of Flappers (1928) - Fräulein Helmers
 Adam and Eve (1928) - Frau Konsul Jensen
 The Blue Mouse (1928) - Frau Lebodier
 The Hero of Every Girl's Dream (1929) - Madame Turbon
 The Girl from the Provinces (1929) - Magda Ronacher
 The Right to Love (1930) - Frau Gebhard - eine Offizierswitwe

Talkies

 Les saltimbanques (1930) - Stella Daniela
 Die Somme: Das Grab der Millionen (1930)
 Zärtlichkeit (1930) - Frl. Lorrmann - Haushälterin
 The Other (1930) - Hallers Schwester
 Marriage in Name Only (1930) - Hanna v. Späth, Schwester Veltens
 Two People (1930) - Gräfin Enna
 Mary (1931) - Miß Miller
 I Go Out and You Stay Here (1931) - Stephanie Derlett, Inhaberin eines Modesalons
 The Theft of the Mona Lisa (1931)
 24 Hours in the Life of a Woman (1931) - Erika
 Rasputin, Demon with Women (1932) - Zarin
  (1932) - Geheimrätin von Schendell
 Eine von uns (1932)
 Mieter Schulze gegen alle (1932)
 The First Right of the Child (1932)
 Adventures on the Lido (1933) - Lucena
 Voices of Spring (1933)
 Unfinished Symphony (1934) - Princess Kinsky
 Everything for the Company (1935) - Ella Sonndorfer
 Little Mother (1935) - Leontine
 Te quiero con locura (1935) - Leontine
 Scandal Sheet (1939) - Mrs. Kopal
 My Son Is Guilty (1939) - Barney's Mother (uncredited)
 Dr. Ehrlich's Magic Bullet (1940) - Miss Marquardt
 Jennie (1940) - Mother Schermer
 So Ends Our Night (1941) - Berlin Nurse (uncredited)
 Shining Victory (1941) - Miss Hoffman
 Nazi Agent (1942) - Mrs. Mohr (uncredited)
 Kings Row (1942) - Secretary (uncredited)
 Secret Agent of Japan (1942) - Mrs. Alecsandri
 Reunion in France (1942) - Woman (uncredited)
 Bomber's Moon (1943) - Greta - Maid (uncredited)
 Hostages (1943) - Gestapo Agent (uncredited)
 Women in Bondage (1943) - German Mother (uncredited)
 The Hitler Gang (1944) - Frau Hanfstaengel (uncredited)
 They Live in Fear (1944) - Frau Stoesen (uncredited)
 Betrayal from the East (1945) - Keller (uncredited)
 The Falcon in San Francisco (1945) - Ms. Carla Keyes (uncredited)
 Renegades (1946) - Mrs. Jackorski (uncredited)
 The Razor's Edge (1946) - Nurse (uncredited)
 Golden Earrings (1947) - Greta Krosigk
 Railroaded! (1947) - Mrs. Ryan
 Letter from an Unknown Woman (1948) - Mother Superior (uncredited)
 Berlin Express (1948) - Frau Borne (uncredited)
 The Dark Past (1948) - Mrs. Linder (uncredited)
 The Mating Season (1951) - German Woman (uncredited)
 The Congregation (1952)
 How to Marry a Millionaire (1953) - Madame (uncredited)
 There's Always Tomorrow (1955) - Tourist's Wife
 My Father, the Actor (1956) - Frl. Dr. Mahlke
 Kelly and Me (1956) - Hilda (uncredited)
 Torn Curtain (1966) - Old Woman Entering at Bus Stop (uncredited) (final film role)

Family 
Sterler (née Minna Stern) was born 20 March 1894 in Bad Cannstatt, Stuttgart, to Max Stern (born 1853) and Bertha Wormser (née Bertha Emilia Wormser; 1865–1936), both of whom married each other 5 July 1888.

See also 
 The Continental Players, a theater workshop of immigrants, of which she was a member

References

General bibliography

 Kester, Bernadette. Film Front Weimar: Representations of the First World War in German Films of the Weimar Period (1919-1933). Amsterdam University Press, 2003.

Inline citations

External links

1894 births
1982 deaths
German stage actresses
German film actresses
German silent film actresses
20th-century German actresses
Actresses from Stuttgart
German expatriate actresses in the United States